Lawrence "Laurie" Auchterlonie (8 December 1867 – 20 January 1948) was a Scottish professional golfer, a native of St Andrews. In 1902, representing the Glen View Club, he won the eighth U.S. Open at Garden City Golf Club in Garden City, New York.

Early life and family
Born in St Andrews, Scotland, Auchterlonie was the older brother of Willie Auchterlonie, who won The Open Championship in 1893. Willie had a son named Laurie, who succeeded his father as honorary professional to the Royal and Ancient Golf Club of St Andrews. This Laurie Auchterlonie should not be confused with his uncle, the U.S. Open winner.

Amateur career
Auchterlonie was over 30 before he became a professional. As an amateur he played in the Open Championship when it was played at St Andrews, in 1888, 1891 and 1895. He entered the Amateur Championship for the first time in 1895, when it was held at St Andrews. He reached the semi-finals, losing at the 19th hole to Leslie Balfour-Melville. He entered again in 1897 at Muirfield and 1898 at Royal Liverpool Golf Club. He won the Dundee Evening Telegraph Cup, the unofficial Scottish Amateur Championship, in 1897 at Leven, Fife, beating David Leitch by 2 holes in the final.

Professional career
Auchterlonie's win at the U.S. Open in October 1902 marked the first time that 80 was broken in all four rounds, as he posted a score of 78-78-74-77=307. (The U.S. Open became a 72-hole event four years earlier, in 1898.) He played with the recently invented Haskell rubber-cored golf ball, which was at least partly responsible for the lower scoring. The new ball had first been used to win an important tournament the previous year, when it was used by Walter Travis at the U.S. Amateur and Sandy Herd at The Open Championship in June. It soon became the standard golf ball.

Auchterlonie competed in the U.S. Open eleven times, with seven top-ten finishes. His other victories included the 1901 Western Open. From 1901 to 1911, he was the head golf professional at Glen View Club in Golf, Illinois, a northwest suburb of Chicago; he returned to his native Scotland in 1911.

Death and legacy
Aucterlonie died in 1948 at age 80 in St Andrews, Scotland. He is best remembered for winning the 1902 U.S. Open.

Major championships

Wins (1)

Results timeline

Note: Auchterlonie only played in the Open Championship, the Amateur Championship, and the U.S. Open.

NYF = Tournament not yet founded
"T" indicates a tie for a place
R256, R128, R64, R32, R16, QF, SF = Round in which player lost in match play

References

External links
Article on the Auchterlonie golf family

Scottish male golfers
Winners of men's major golf championships
Golfers from St Andrews
1867 births
1948 deaths